Cork is an unincorporated community in Butts County, in the U.S. state of Georgia.

History
A variant name was "Dublin". The present name is after Cork, in Ireland, the native land of a large share of the early settlers.

References

Unincorporated communities in Butts County, Georgia
Unincorporated communities in Georgia (U.S. state)